Berajondo is a rural locality in the Gladstone Region, Queensland, Australia. In the  Berajondo had a population of 61 people.

History 
Milsted Provisional School opened on 3 June 1895. On 1 January 1909 it became Milstead State School. In 1911 it was renamed Murray's Creek State School and then renamed in 1931 as Berajondo State School. It closed on 31 December 1965. 

In the  Berajondo had a population of 61 people.

References 

Gladstone Region
Localities in Queensland